The Pakistan Scientific and Technological Information Centre (PASTIC) is a research institute and premier national organization of the government of Pakistan with prime focus on scientific academic principles and research and the dissemination of scientific studies and information technology. It is principally focused on providing academic assistance to the scientists, researchers, academicians, industrialists, entrepreneurs, planners, and policymakers among others. It also consists information about science, engineering and technology for research and development of technology.

An expanded project of the Pakistan Council of Scientific & Industrial Research (PCSIR) and a subsidiary of the Pakistan Science Foundation, it is headquartered in Quaid-i-Azam University campus, Islamabad. Its six branches are located in Karachi, Lahore, Faisalabad, Peshawar, Muzaffarabad and Quetta. The PASTIC consists of a database of full-text science and technology documents, publication the Pakistan Journal of Computer and Information System (PJCIS) and secondary journals of abstracts which are available in ten academic disciplines, in addition to serving as a database of patents, bibliographic information, compilation of Union catalogues and directories, and reprographic printing services grouped into mimeographing, photocopier and microfilming.

History 
The Pakistan Scientific and Technological Information Centre was established in 1974 under the UNESCO-assisted organisation the Pakistan National Scientific and Technical Documentation Centre (PANSDOC) which works under the Pakistan Council of Scientific & Industrial Research (PCSIR). PASTIC was later transferred from PCSIR to Pakistan Science Foundation (PSF) and started serving as a subsidiary of PSF. It also provide financial assistance to the National Digital Archive of Pakistani.

PASTIC plays central role in developing networking of journals and publishers communities with objectives for preservation of national research content. It preserve publishing material in full-text format, standardization of scientific journals, repository. It has maintained a visualization mechanism for reviewing research-oriented materials.

Background 
The PASTIC assist journal publishers in providing free web hosting for journal, import and export of data and data backup in addition to providing financial aid for digitization and capacity building of scientific, journal, and publishing communities.

Working under the Ministry of Science and Technology, its main functions are to provide academic support for researchers with information technology resources. Data is provided through its libraries by coordinating with the Pakistani universities and center of excellence communities.

Organisational structure 
The PASTIC is headed by the Pakistan Science Foundation (PSF) chairperson and the PASTIC's director general. They are responsible for administrative tasks of its sub-centres, management, scientific and technical wings. Management wing consists of account and admin section responsible for finance and administration of management wing.

References 

1974 establishments in Pakistan
Organizations established in 1774
Research institutes in Pakistan
Pakistan federal departments and agencies
Databases in Pakistan
Bibliographic database providers
Bibliographic databases in engineering
Library catalogues